The 1992–93 I-Divisioona season was the 19th season of the I-Divisioona, the second level of Finnish ice hockey. 12 teams participated in the league, and JoKP Joensuu won the championship. KooKoo, TuTo Hockey, and JoKP Joensuu qualified for the SM-liiga promotion/relegation round.

Regular season

External links 
 Finnish Ice Hockey Federation

2
Fin
I-Divisioona seasons